The New Mexico Chiles were an American soccer club established in 1990 which competed in the American Professional Soccer League.  In 1991, the team merged with the New Mexico Roadrunners and moved to the USISL until its disestablishment in 1996.

History
In 1986, the semi-professional Albuquerque Outlaws entered the newly established Southwest Indoor Soccer League.  In 1987, the team became the Albuquerque Gunners. In 1989, the SISL and Gunners began playing both a summer outdoor as well as a winter indoor season.  The team was renamed the New Mexico Roadrunners for the 1990/91 indoor season.

In 1990, the New Mexico Chiles were established as an expansion franchise in the American Professional Soccer League.  Following the season, the ownership dissolved. Players and organizers then merged with the New Mexico Roadrunners.  The new team took on the Chiles name and logo and competed in the USISL until it folded in 1996.

The legacy of semi-pro/pro soccer in Albuquerque and New Mexico would be revived with the birth of the Albuquerque Geckos, who would play in the USL D-3 Pro League in 1997, winning the championship, and jumping up to the USL A-League from 1998–1999.

SISL/USISL

Year-by-year

References 

Defunct indoor soccer clubs in the United States
Defunct soccer clubs in New Mexico
USISL teams
American Professional Soccer League teams
1990 establishments in New Mexico
1996 disestablishments in New Mexico
Association football clubs established in 1990
Association football clubs disestablished in 1996
Sports in Albuquerque, New Mexico